Human embryonic kidney 293 cells, also often referred to as HEK 293, HEK-293, 293 cells, or less precisely as HEK cells, are a specific immortalised cell line derived from a spontaneously miscarried or aborted fetus or human embryonic kidney cells grown in tissue culture taken from a female fetus in 1973.

HEK 293 cells have been widely used in cell biology research for many years, because of their reliable growth and propensity for transfection. They are also used by the biotechnology industry to produce therapeutic proteins and viruses for gene therapy as well as safety testing for a vast array of chemicals.

293T (or HEK 293T) is a derivative human cell line that expresses a mutant version of the SV40 large T antigen.  It is very commonly used in biological research for making proteins and producing recombinant retroviruses.

History 
HEK 293 cells were generated in 1973 by transfection of cultures of normal human embryonic kidney cells with sheared adenovirus 5 DNA in Alex van der Eb's laboratory in Leiden, the Netherlands. The cells were obtained from a single, aborted or miscarried fetus, the precise origin of which is unclear. The cells were cultured by van der Eb; the transduction by adenovirus was performed by Frank Graham, a post-doc in van der Eb's lab. They were published in 1977 after Graham left Leiden for McMaster University. They are called HEK since they originated in human embryonic kidney cultures, while the number 293 came from Graham's habit of numbering his experiments; the original HEK 293 cell clone was from his 293rd experiment. Graham performed the transfection a total of eight times, obtaining just one clone of cells that were cultured for several months. After presumably adapting to tissue culture, cells from this clone developed into the relatively stable HEK 293 line.

Subsequent analysis has shown that the transformation was brought about by inserting ~4.5 kilobases from the left arm of the viral genome, which became incorporated into human chromosome 19.

For many years it was assumed that HEK 293 cells were generated by transformation of either a fibroblastic, endothelial or epithelial cell, all of which are abundant in kidneys. However, the original adenovirus transformation was inefficient, suggesting that the cell that finally produced the HEK 293 line may have been unusual in some fashion. Graham and coworkers provided evidence that HEK 293 cells and other human cell lines generated by adenovirus transformation of human embryonic kidney cells have many properties of immature neurons, suggesting that the adenovirus preferentially transformed a neuronal lineage cell in the original kidney culture.

A comprehensive study of the genomes and transcriptomes of HEK 293 and five derivative cell lines compared the HEK 293 transcriptome with that of human kidney, adrenal, pituitary and central nervous tissue. The HEK 293 pattern most closely resembled that of adrenal cells, which have many neuronal properties. Given the location of the adrenal gland (adrenal means "next to the kidney"), a few adrenal cells could plausibly have appeared in an embryonic kidney derived culture, and could be preferentially transformed by adenovirus. Adenoviruses transform neuronal lineage cells much more efficiently than typical human kidney epithelial cells. An embryonic adrenal precursor cell therefore seems the most likely origin cell of the HEK 293 line. As a consequence, HEK 293 cells should not be used as an in vitro model of typical kidney cells.

HEK 293 cells have a complex karyotype, exhibiting two or more copies of each chromosome and with a modal chromosome number of 64. They are described as hypotriploid, containing less than three times the number of chromosomes of a haploid human gamete. Chromosomal abnormalities include a total of three copies of the X chromosomes and four copies of chromosome 17 and chromosome 22.  The presence of multiple X chromosomes and the lack of any trace of Y chromosome derived sequence suggest that the source fetus was female.

The 293T cell line was created in Michele Calos's lab at Stanford by stable transfection of the HEK 293 cell line with a plasmid encoding a temperature-sensitive mutant of the SV40 large T antigen; it was originally referred to as 293/tsA1609neo.  The first reference to the cell line as "293T" may be its use to create the BOSC23 packaging cell line for producing retroviral particles.

Variants 

Multiple variants of HEK 293 have been reported.

HEK 293T 
The transfection used to create 293T (involving plasmid pRSV-1609) conferred neomycin/G418 resistance and expression of the tsA1609 allele of SV40 large T antigen; this allele is fully active at 33 °C (its permissive temperature), has substantial function at 37 °C, and is inactive at 40 °C.  293T is very efficiently transfectable with DNA (like its parent HEK 293).  Due to the expression of SV40 large T antigen, transfected plasmid DNAs that carry the SV40 origin of replication can replicate in 293T and will transiently maintain a high copy number; this can greatly increase the amount of recombinant protein or retrovirus that can be produced from the cells.

The full genome sequences of three different isolates of 293T have been determined.  They are quite similar to each other but show detectable divergence from the parental HEK 293 cell line.

Applications 

HEK 293 cells are straightforward to grow in culture and to transfect. They have been used as hosts for gene expression. Typically, these experiments involve transfecting in a gene (or combination of genes) of interest, and then analyzing the expressed protein. The widespread use of this cell line is due to its transfectability by the various techniques, including calcium phosphate method, achieving efficiencies approaching 100%.

Examples of such experiments include:

 Effects of a drug on sodium channels
 Inducible RNA interference system
 Isoform-selective protein kinase C agonist
 Interaction between two proteins
 Nuclear export signal in a protein

HEK 293 cells were adapted to grow in suspension culture, as opposed to proliferation on plastic plates, in 1985. This enabled the growth of large amounts of recombinant adenovirus vectors.

A more specific use of HEK 293 cells is in the propagation of adenoviral vectors. Viruses offer an efficient means of delivering genes into cells, which they evolved to do, and are thus of great use as experimental tools. However, as pathogens, they also present a risk to the experimenter. This danger can be avoided by the use of viruses which lack key genes, and which are thus unable to replicate after entering a cell. In order to propagate such viral vectors, a cell line that expresses the missing genes is required. Since HEK 293 cells express a number of adenoviral genes, they can be used to propagate adenoviral vectors in which these genes (typically, E1 and E3) are deleted, such as AdEasy. However, homologous recombination between the inserted cellular Ad5 sequence and the vector sequence, although rare, can restore the replication capacity to the vector.

An important variant of this cell line is the 293T cell line. It contains the SV40 large T-antigen that allows for episomal replication of transfected plasmids containing the SV40 origin of replication. This allows for amplification of transfected plasmids and extended temporal expression of desired gene products. HEK 293, and especially HEK 293T, cells are commonly used for the production of various retroviral vectors. Various retroviral packaging cell lines are also based on these cells.

Native proteins of interest 

Depending on various conditions, the gene expression of HEK 293 cells may vary. The following proteins of interest (among many others) are commonly found in untreated HEK 293 cells:

 Corticotrophin releasing factor type 1 receptor
 Sphingosine-1-phosphate receptors EDG1, EDG3 and EDG5
 Muscarinic acetylcholine receptor M3
 Transient receptor potential TRPC1, TRPC3, TRPC4, TRPC6

Bioethics 
Alvin Wong argues that despite the uncertainty over the origin of the fetus used to obtain the cell line, circumstantial evidence strongly suggests that it came from a voluntary abortion. To some Catholics and Eastern Orthodox Christians, this presents an ethical dilemma for using HEK 293 and derivative products, such as vaccines and many medications.

On 21 December 2020, the Roman Catholic Congregation for the Doctrine of the Faith, with the approval of the Pope, stated that “it is morally acceptable to receive COVID-19 vaccines that have used cell lines from aborted fetuses in their research and production process”, but only where other alternatives are non-existent (or currently unavailable), or when there is the risk of a worse danger. 

During the COVID-19 pandemic, anti-vaccination activists noted that HEK 293 cells are used in the manufacturing of the Oxford–AstraZeneca COVID-19 vaccine (AKA AZD1222). The cells are filtered out of the final products.

According to pharmaceutical companies, such as Regeneron Pharmaceuticals, the modern cell line is so far removed from its origin that it is no longer considered fetal tissue.

See also 
 Immortalised cell line

References

External links 

 HEK 293 Transfection and Selection Data @ Cell-culture Database
 A HEK293 Cell Database
 293 Cells (CRL-1573)  in the ATCC database
 Transcript of FDA meeting, in which, starting page 77, van der Eb describes in detail the origin of HEK 293 cell
 293T in the Culture Collections of Public Health England
 Cellosaurus entry for HEK 293 and HEK 293T
ATCC entry for 293T

Human cell lines
Bioethics